SREC may refer to:

 Solar renewable energy certificates, a form of tax incentive for alternative energy used in some U.S. states
 Sussex Rural Electric Cooperative, a New Jersey electric power company.
 The Motorola S-record format, a computer data format for encoding binary data in ASCII 
 Sri Ramakrishna Engineering College, a college situated in Vattamalaipalayam, Tamil Nadu, India